Mark Ward is an Irish Sinn Féin politician who has been a Teachta Dála (TD) for the Dublin Mid-West constituency since the 2019 by-election.

Early life
Ward grew up in Harelawn, north Clondalkin and was diagnosed with multiple sclerosis in 2005. He is a qualified behavioural therapist, having diplomas from NUI Maynooth and University College Dublin and a B.A. in Community Development and Addiction Studies from IT Carlow.

Political career
Ward was co-opted onto South Dublin County Council on 14 March 2016, representing the Clondalkin local electoral area. He was elected Mayor of South Dublin in June 2018, serving until June 2019. He was reelected to the council in the May 2019 election, this time for the Palmerstown–Fonthill local electoral area. On 30 November 2019, he was elected to Dáil Éireann in the 2019 Dublin Mid-West by-election. Lisa Colman was co-opted to Ward's seat on South Dublin County Council following his election to the Dáil. Despite predictions that he would lose his seat, he retained it at the 2020 general election, alongside his running mate Eoin O'Broin.

Personal life
Ward has three children. He is an avid fan of Dublin Gaelic footballers, having a full back tattoo of the Dublin GAA crest. From November 2016 until 2017, he was homeless, and this experience has resulted in him vowing to focus on housing as his main priority in politics.

References

External links

 

Year of birth missing (living people)
Living people
Politicians from County Dublin
Sinn Féin TDs (post-1923)
Local councillors in South Dublin (county)
Members of the 32nd Dáil
Alumni of University College Dublin
Alumni of Maynooth University
Alumni of Institute of Technology, Carlow
Mayors of places in the Republic of Ireland
People with multiple sclerosis
Members of the 33rd Dáil